Maximum Fighting Championship is a Canadian mixed martial arts (MMA) promotion based in Edmonton, Alberta. MFC’s former home, in Canada, is the River Cree Resort and Casino in Enoch, Alberta, located just outside Edmonton, Alberta, but has also held events at the Edmonton Expo Centre. MFC events are broadcast on The Fight Network, AXS TV (formerly HDnet) in North America and most recently TSN2.

History
Maximum Fighting Championship was founded on March 3, 2001, by Pavelich Sports Inc. Mark Pavelich is the CEO of MFC and runs the business day to day. Dave Pavelich is Vice President and Manon Pavelich is the booker.

MFC currently airs on AXS TV Fights in the U.S. and The Fight Network in Canada. MFC’s former home was the River Cree Resort and Casino in Enoch, Alberta, Canada located just outside Edmonton, Alberta. Their new home is the Mayfield Inn Trade and Conference Centre Edmonton, Alberta. In July 2011, MFC signed a five-year live TV deal with HDnet (now AXS TV) and in October 2011, MFC signed with TSN2.

MFC hosts heavyweight fights but doesn't have a heavyweight championship due to the lack of heavyweights outside of the top promotions.

MFC employs the Unified Rules of Mixed Martial Arts. All MFC bouts take place in a ring, with the exception of MFC 29 which, in accordance with the regulations utilized in Ontario which requires all mixed martial arts fights to be held in a cage structure, took place in a circular cage named "The Ring" by the winner of a "Name the Cage" fan contest.

In 2012, MFC announced the re-launched its heavyweight division and the upcoming debut of a featherweight division. In 2013, the Maximum Fighting Championship also announced that the organization would add a bantamweight with the debut bout taking place on May 19, 2013, at MFC 37: True Grit.

MFC has not held an event since MFC 41 'All In" on October 3, 2014.

Mark Pavelich announced that Maximum Fighting Championship was up for sale on February 18, 2016.

MFC has featured notable fighters, such as Ryan Jimmo, Graham Spencer, Tom Watson and Douglas Lima, plus MMA veterans, such as Jason MacDonald, Thales Leites, Jay Silva, Trevor Prangley, and Paul Daley.

Rules
MFC employs the Unified Rules of Mixed Martial Arts.

Rounds
Every round in MFC competition is five minutes in duration. Title matches have five such rounds, and non-title matches have three. There is a one-minute rest period between rounds.

Weight divisions

MFC currently uses six weight classes:

Attire
All competitors must fight in approved shorts, without shoes. Shirts, gis or long pants (including gi pants) are not allowed. Fighters must use approved light-weight open-fingered gloves, that include at least 1" of padding around the knuckles, (110 to 170 g / 4 to 6 ounces) that allow fingers to grab. These gloves enable fighters to punch with less risk of an injured or broken hand, while retaining the ability to grab and grapple.

Match outcome
Matches usually end via:
Submission: a fighter clearly taps on the mat or his opponent or verbally submits.
Technical Submission: A technical submission is achieved when the referee stops a fight due to an injury resulting from a submission hold or due to a fighter going unconscious from a choke.
Knockout: a fighter falls from a legal blow and is either unconscious or unable to immediately continue.
Technical Knockout (TKO): If a fighter cannot continue, the fight is ended as a technical knockout. Technical knockouts can be classified into three categories:
referee stoppage: (the referee determines a fighter cannot "intelligently defend" himself; if warnings to the fighter to improve his position or defense go unanswered—generally, two warnings are given, about 5 seconds apart)
doctor stoppage (a ringside doctor due to injury or impending injury, as when blood flows into the eyes and blinds a fighter)
corner stoppage (a fighter's own corner-man signals defeat for their own fighter)
Judges' Decision: Depending on scoring, a match may end as:
unanimous decision (all three judges score a win for fighter A)
majority decision (two judges score a win for fighter A, one judge scores a draw)
split decision (two judges score a win for fighter A, one judge scores a win for fighter B)
unanimous draw (all three judges score a draw)
majority draw (two judges score a draw, one judge scoring a win)
split draw (one judge scores a win for fighter A, one judge scores a win for fighter B, and one judge scores a draw)

Note: In the event of a draw, it is not necessary that the fighters' total points be equal. However, in a unanimous or split draw, each fighter does score an equal number of win judgments from the three judges (0 or 1, respectively).

A fight can also end in a technical decision, disqualification, forfeit, technical draw, or no contest. The latter two outcomes have no winners.

Judging criteria
The ten-point must system is in effect for all fights; three judges score each round and the winner of each receives ten points, the loser nine points or fewer. If the round is even, both fighters receive ten points.

Fouls
The Nevada State Athletic Commission currently lists the following as fouls:
Butting with the head
Eye gouging of any kind
Biting
Hair pulling
Fish hooking
Groin attacks of any kind
Putting a finger into any orifice or into any cut or laceration on an opponent. (see Gouging)
Small joint manipulation
Striking to the spine or the back of the head (see Rabbit punch)
Striking downward using the point of the elbow (see Elbow (strike))
Throat strikes of any kind, including, without limitation, grabbing the trachea
Clawing, pinching or twisting the flesh
Grabbing the clavicle
Kicking the head of a grounded opponent
Kneeing the head of a grounded opponent
Stomping a grounded opponent
Kicking to the kidney with the heel
Spiking an opponent to the canvas on his head or neck. (see piledriver)
Throwing an opponent out of the ring or fenced area
Holding the shorts or gloves of an opponent
Spitting at an opponent
Engaging in unsportsmanlike conduct that causes an injury to an opponent
Holding the ropes or the fence
Using abusive language in the ring or fenced area
Attacking an opponent on or during the break
Attacking an opponent who is under the care of the referee
Attacking an opponent after the bell (horn) has sounded the end of a round
Flagrantly disregarding the instructions of the referee
Timidity, including, without limitation, avoiding contact with an opponent, intentionally or consistently dropping the mouthpiece or faking an injury
Interference by the corner
Throwing in the towel during competition

When a foul is charged, the referee in their discretion may deduct one or more points as a penalty. If a foul incapacitates a fighter, then the match may end in a disqualification if the foul was intentional, or a no contest if unintentional. If a foul causes a fighter to be unable to continue later in the bout, it ends with a technical decision win to the injured fighter if the injured fighter is ahead on points, otherwise it is a technical draw.

Match conduct
 After a verbal warning the referee can stop the fighters and stand them up if they reach a stalemate on the ground (where neither are in a dominant position or working towards one).
 If the referee pauses the match, it is resumed with the fighters in their prior positions.
 Grabbing the ring ropes brings a verbal warning, followed by an attempt by the referee to release the grab by pulling on the grabbing hand. If that attempt fails or if the fighter continues to hold the ropes, the referee may charge a foul.

Title fights
On September 18, 2012 MFC instituted new regulations regarding title fights.

Title Fight with a reigning/defending champion
If the champion fails to make weight:
SCENARIO 1 – The champion vacates the title immediately. The fight remains a five-round contest. If the vacated champion wins the fight, the Maximum Fighting Championship holds the option to automatically consider him the No. 1 contender for the next title fight in that weight class. The Maximum Fighting Championship also holds an option to make an immediate rematch.
SCENARIO 2 – The champion vacates the title immediately. The fight remains a five-round contest. If the challenger wins the fight, the challenger becomes the MFC champion. The Maximum Fighting Championship holds an option to make an immediate rematch.
If the challenger fails to make weight:
The champion automatically retains the belt. A non-title fight takes place and the Maximum Fighting Championship solely determines if the bout is a three- or five-round fight. If the challenger wins the bout, the Maximum Fighting Championship holds an option to make a future rematch.
If both fighters fail to make weight:
The champion vacates the title immediately. A non-title fight takes place and the Maximum Fighting Championship solely determines if the bout is a three- or five-round fight. The Maximum Fighting Championship holds the option to consider the winner of the bout as the No. 1 contender for the next title fight in that weight class. The Maximum Fighting Championship also holds an option to make future rematch.
Title Fight with a vacant championship
If one fighter fails to make weight:
The fight remains a five-round contest. If the fighter who made weight wins the bout, he becomes the MFC champion of that weight class. If the fighter who failed to make weight wins the bout, that fighter does not claim the title, and the Maximum Fighting Championship holds the option to make him the No. 1 contender and/or to make an immediate rematch.
If both fighters fail to make weight:
A non-title bout takes place and the Maximum Fighting Championship solely determines if the bout is a three- or five-round fight. The Maximum Fighting Championship holds the option to make a future rematch.

Events

As of October 3, 2014, the Maximum Fighting Championship has held a total of 44 events, all of which have taken place in Alberta, Canada, with the exception of MFC 29 which took place in Windsor, Ontario, Canada.

Current champions

Title history

Heavyweight Championship
Weight limit:

Light Heavyweight Championship
Weight limit:

Middleweight Championship
Weight limit:

Welterweight Championship
Weight limit:

Lightweight Championship
Weight limit:

Bantamweight Championship
Weight limit:

Champions by nationality

References

External links
Official MFC Site
MFC event results at Sherdog
Latest MFC news at Top MMA News

Organizations established in 2001
Mixed martial arts organizations
Organizations based in Edmonton
Defunct brands
Defunct companies